The 2019 Rushmoor Borough Council election took place on 2 May 2019 to elect members of Rushmoor Borough Council in England. This was on the same day as other local elections.

Results

|}

Ward results

Aldershot Park

Cherrywood

Cove and Southwood

Empress

Fernhill

Knellwood

Manor Park

North Town

Rowhill

St John’s

St Mark’s

Wellington

West Heath

References 

2019 English local elections
Rushmoor Borough Council elections
2010s in Hampshire